K. R. Arjunan (born 1961 in Ooty) is a politician. He was a former Member of Parliament, representing Tamil Nadu in the Rajya Sabha (the upper house of India's Parliament). 
K. R. Arjunan belongs to the All India Anna Dravida Munnetra Kazhagam (AIADMK) political party.

See also
Rajya Sabha election in Tamil Nadu, 2013

References

1961 births
Living people
All India Anna Dravida Munnetra Kazhagam politicians
Rajya Sabha members from Tamil Nadu
People from Ooty